Roland Dorgelès (15 June 1885 – 18 March 1973) was a French novelist and a member of the Académie Goncourt.

Born in Amiens, Somme, under the name Roland Lecavelé (he adopted the pen name Dorgelès to commemorate visits to the spa town of Argelès), he spent his childhood in Paris.

A prolific author, he is most renowned for the Prix Femina-winning Wooden crosses, a moving study of World War I, in which he served. It was published in 1919 (in English by William Heinemann in 1920).

Dorgelès served as a juror with Florence Meyer Blumenthal in awarding the Prix Blumenthal, a grant given between 1919 and 1954 to painters, sculptors, decorators, engravers, writers and musicians.

See also 
 Joachim-Raphaël Boronali

References

External links
 Wooden crosses online

1885 births
1973 deaths
People from Amiens
20th-century French novelists
Prix Femina winners
French military personnel of World War I
Prix Blumenthal
French male novelists
20th-century French male writers
20th-century pseudonymous writers